Paul Andrew McLaren (born 17 November 1976) is an English former professional footballer who last played for Oxford United in 2012. He was born in High Wycombe.

Career
He began his career as a trainee for Luton Town, playing over 160 games over eight seasons. He left Luton to step up a Division for Sheffield Wednesday where he played 96 games and scored six goals. He turned down a contract offer, however, by Chris Turner after the club's relegation and subsequent failure to gain promotion to The Championship. He played for Rotherham United under Ronnie Moore and in the 2006–07 close season signed a two-year contract for Moore's new club Tranmere Rovers having left  Rotherham. In his debut season at the centre of the Rovers midfield McLaren started 42 of Tranmere's 46 games in League One, and a further 43 the following season and being named Player of the year.

McLaren is a central midfielder, with an excellent assist record—13 during the 2007–08 season—mainly due to his passing and set piece ability.

He turned down a new contract offer from Tranmere and instead, on 1 July 2008, signed a two-year deal with League Two club Bradford City. He was one of four Bradford players to make his debut on the opening day of the 2008–09 season against Notts County, which Bradford won 2–1. His first goal for his new club came on 30 August 2008, with the opening goal in a 3–2 defeat to Aldershot Town. He was a regular in the Bradford side but missed a month of the season during February and March because of a calf injury, before leaving  at the end of the season.

On 10 July 2009 McLaren rejoined Tranmere on a two-year contract. He scored his first Tranmere goal upon his return when he scored at home to Grimsby in a first-round League Cup tie on 11 August 2009. On 26 November 2010, McLaren decided to leave Tranmere Rovers as he wasn't enjoying the type of football they were playing. A little over a month later, on 31 December 2010, he joined Oxford United until the end of the 2010–11 season.
 In May 2012, McLaren left the club and rejoined his family in Cheshire.

References

External links

1976 births
Sportspeople from High Wycombe
Living people
Association football midfielders
English footballers
Luton Town F.C. players
Rotherham United F.C. players
Sheffield Wednesday F.C. players
Tranmere Rovers F.C. players
Bradford City A.F.C. players
Oxford United F.C. players
English Football League players
Footballers from Buckinghamshire